Echecrates was a Thessalian military officer of Ptolemy Philopator in the Fourth Syrian War with Antiochus the Great in 219 BC.  Echecrates was employed in the levying of troops and their arrangement into separate companies. He was entrusted with the command of the Greek forces in Ptolemy's pay, and of all the mercenary cavalry. According to Polybius, he did good service in the war, especially at the Battle of Raphia in 217 BC.

He is also known for kidnapping a young maiden serving as the oracle at Delphi, causing oracles serving thereafter to be older women who instead dressed youthfully.

References

Hellenistic Thessalians
Ptolemaic generals
3rd-century BC Greek people
Ancient Thessalian generals